Laguna FC is a former football team from Gibraltar, and current futsal team, currently playing in the Gibraltar Futsal Premier Division.

History
They played in the Gibraltar Football League's First Division, spending a prolonged period as one of the stronger sides in the division behind the dominant Lincoln Red Imps. The side eventually withdrew from the football league. A futsal side continues to operate under the name Laguna 2007 Futsal Club (currently known as VR Solutions Laguna for sponsorship reasons).

Current futsal squad

Notes

External links 
 Official website

Defunct football clubs in Gibraltar
Futsal clubs in Gibraltar